Hanna Zoey Tur (formerly Robert Albert Tur; born June 8, 1960) is an American broadcast reporter and commercial pilot who created Los Angeles News Service with fellow reporter and then-wife Marika Gerrard.

Early life and education
Born to a Jewish family, Tur dropped out of college at age 18 in 1978.

Career
Los Angeles News Service was the first to use an AStar helicopter in a major city to cover breaking news, and the first to televise a high-speed police chase. Tur's other noteworthy reporting included the attack on Reginald Denny during the 1992 Los Angeles riots and finding the crash site of Pacific Southwest Airlines Flight 1771. Tur was also the first to broadcast O. J. Simpson's slow-speed chase on June 17, 1994.

On March 25, 1989 Tur used a helicopter to locate a camper in desperate need of a Kidney transplant.  This incident was reenacted on the television program Rescue 911.

As a team, Tur and Gerrard received three Television News Emmy Awards and Edward R. Murrow Awards for broadcast excellence, an Associated Press National Breaking News award; and The National Press Photographers Association (NPPA) Humanitarian Award.

In 1991, the Federal Aviation Administration (FAA) revoked Tur's pilot's license for "reckless flying" after a complaint from the Los Angeles City Fire Department. In 1994, a California Superior Court ruled against the Los Angeles Fire Department for suborning perjury in the original FAA action, awarding $550,000 and ruling that "public employees are not immune from liability for malicious prosecution if they instigate the prosecution through fraudulent, corrupt or malicious misrepresentations".

Tur has been credited with locating seven missing aircraft.

In 2007, Tur hosted a documentary series on MSNBC called Why They Run. The show reported on why criminal suspects ran from police, and included interviews with those involved in police pursuits.

In 2015, Tur appeared in three episodes of Inside Edition on CNN, on TMZ, and on Dr. Drew On Call.

In 2016, Tur appeared in several episodes of the miniseries O.J.: Made In America. The series features archival footage as well as Tur's recollections of covering the 1992 Los Angeles riots in episode 2 and of the June 17, 1994 police chase of O. J. Simpson.

Personal life

Tur's 23-year marriage to Marika Gerrard came to an end in 2003. The couple had two children: Katy, a television news reporter and anchor, and James, who is a physician.

In June 2013, Tur publicly came out as transgender, and in 2014 revealed that she was undergoing hormone replacement therapy. In August 2014, following gender reassignment surgery, she applied to a court to change her name and gender marker from male to female. Reflecting on her transition in a 2017 interview, Tur stated, "What I have is not political. It's a medical condition that was treated. I'm cured. I'm done. It's not a mental illness. There are differences in the brain."

In 2017, Tur said in an interview that her daughter Katy had become estranged from her because of the transition. Katy said in response that they "were not on speaking terms for a little while" but that it was not because of the transition.

Tur is a principal subject of Katy Tur's 2022 memoir, Rough Draft. It depicts life for the younger Tur in her childhood that saw the highs of adventure with her parents but also lows that related to violence that made for a shaky childhood upbringing that she equated to "living on the edge of a knife", specifically from her father. The 2013 call involving the elder Tur's transition was part of the estrangement, with Katy stating, "My dad, in going through the transition wanted to bury Bob Tur … have that personality be erased. But Bob Tur was so much a part of my life that I felt if we wanted to move on and become something new, we’d have to confront it.”

Views on transgender rights
During a TMZ video chat in the summer of 2013, Tur described her understanding of one practical impact of the changes in her brain over the course of her hormone replacement therapy in piloting terms. Tur stated, "...you start thinking with white matter as opposed to men thinking with gray matter, so, where I was able to make split decisions flying and being in really rough conditions, weather conditions, I don't know if I'd be as good a pilot, because now I'm using white matter, and I'm becoming, really... That bridges the left and right brains, and you become [a] consensus builder, you start becoming more analytical, not as impulsive as you are when you're a guy." In their editorial comments, TMZ interpreted her words as meaning that she "doesn't believe women can make the same quick, decisive decisions like men when piloting an aircraft."

Tur’s critics have included Dana Beyer of Gender Rights Maryland, Shannon Minter of The National Center for Lesbian Rights, trans journalist Parker Marie Molloy, and trans blogger Mya Adriene Byrne.

In July 2015, while on Dr. Drew On Call talking about Caitlyn Jenner accepting the Arthur Ashe Courage Award at the ESPY Awards ceremony, political commentator Ben Shapiro questioned her genetics and called Tur "sir", to which Tur responded by grabbing the back of Shapiro's neck and telling him to stop or he would "be going home in an ambulance." Shapiro filed a police report charging Tur with battery regarding the incident and said that he intended to press charges. Shapiro said he did so to teach the left a lesson. Tur said the report was Shapiro's attempt to keep the story in the news.

References

External links
 

1960 births
Living people
American television journalists
Commercial aviators
Jewish American journalists
American LGBT journalists
LGBT people from California
Transgender women
American women television journalists
American women commercial aviators
Aviators from California
21st-century American Jews
21st-century American women